Edwardian Farm is a British historical documentary TV series in twelve parts, first shown on BBC Two from November 2010 to January 2011. As the third series on the BBC historic farm series, following the original, Tales from the Green Valley, it depicts a group of historians recreating the running of a farm during the Edwardian era. It was made for the BBC by independent production company Lion Television and filmed at Morwellham Quay, an historic port in Devon. The farming team was historian Ruth Goodman and archaeologists Alex Langlands and Peter Ginn. The series was devised and produced by David Upshal and directed by Stuart Elliott, Chris Michell and Naomi Benson.

The series is a development from two previous series, Victorian Farm and Victorian Pharmacy, which were among BBC Two's biggest hits of 2009 and 2010, receiving audiences of up to 3.8 million per episode. The series was followed by Wartime Farm in September 2012, featuring the same team but this time in Hampshire on Manor Farm, living a full calendar year as World War II-era farmers.

An associated book by Goodman, Langlands, and Ginn, also titled Edwardian Farm, was published in 2010 by BBC Books.  The series was also published on DVD.

Episodes

{| class="wikitable plainrowheaders" width="100%" style="margin-right: 0;"
|-
! style="background-color: #689CCF; color: #ffffff;" width=6% | #
! style="background-color: #689CCF; color: #ffffff;" width=20% | Title
! style="background-color: #689CCF; color: #ffffff;" width=20% | Directed by
! style="background-color: #689CCF; color: #ffffff;" width=23% | Original air date
|-

|}

References

External links
 

BBC2 Edwardian Farm blog by Ruth Goodman
Ruth Goodman website
Alex Langlands website
Appreciation in The Guardian

2010 British television series debuts
2011 British television series endings
2010s British documentary television series
Reenactment of the late modern period
Television series by All3Media
English-language television shows
Historical reality television series
BBC historic farm series
BBC television documentaries about history during the 20th Century
Television shows about agriculture